Renu Rani (born 16 January 2001) is an Indian women's international footballer who plays as a forward for the India women's national team.

Early life
Renu was born in Mangali Mohabat, Haryana.

Club career
Renu has played for Kickstart FC in India.

International career
Renu made her senior debut for India on 8 April 2021 as a 88th-minute substitution in a 1–2 friendly loss to Belarus.. She scored her first goal for national team against Chinese Taipei in a friendly match on 13 October 2021.

International goals
Scores and results list India's goal tally first.

References

External links 
 Renu Rani at All India Football Federation
 

2001 births
Living people
People from Hisar district
Footballers from Haryana
Sportswomen from Haryana
21st-century Indian women
21st-century Indian people
Indian women's footballers
Women's association football forwards
India women's international footballers
India women's youth international footballers
Sethu FC players
Indian Women's League players